Young Man with a Horn is a 1938 novel by Dorothy Baker that is loosely based on the real life of jazz cornet player Bix Beiderbecke. The novel was adapted for the movie Young Man With a Horn (1950) with Kirk Douglas, Doris Day, Lauren Bacall, Juano Hernández, and real-life Bix Beiderbecke friend and collaborator Hoagy Carmichael

Preface
Dorothy Baker explained that the inspiration for the book was jazz cornetist, pianist, and composer Bix Beiderbecke. In the Preface, she wrote: "The inspiration for the writing of this book has been the music, but not the life, of a great musician, Leon (Bix) Beiderbecke, who died in the year 1931. The characters and events of the story are entirely fictitious and do not refer to real musicians, living or dead, or to actual happenings."

Plot introduction
It is a fictionalized novel on jazz set in a world of speakeasies and big bands during The Jazz Age of the 1920s. It is  loosely based on the life of the great cornet player Bix Beiderbecke who died in 1931 at the age of 28. It tells the story of Rick Martin, a tormented genius from childhood until his death at age 30.

The racial component of jazz is addressed. Ever since the first jazz record was released in 1917 by the white band The Original Dixieland Jazz Band, race has been an inherent issue in the new musical genre of jazz. In the wake of the success of the ODJB, both white and black musicians and bands emerged. The story also dwells on the white/black abilities to play jazz. Rick, however, establishes a strong relationship with white and black musicians. The book details both the widely accepted public view of the jazz musician of the time as well as a musician's own struggle for perfection. This drive finally destroys Rick.

Releases
The novel has been reprinted many times in hardcover and paperback editions and has been published in German, Italian, French, and Spanish translations. The movie version of the book has been released on VHS, DVD, and Blu-ray.

References
Review of Young Man with a Horn by Jesse Kornbluth, for HeadButler.com . accessed January 2009

1938 American novels
American novels adapted into films
Houghton Mifflin books